Wilson Henry Mills (10 January 1882 – 27 March 1955) was a Liberal party member of the House of Commons of Canada. He was born in Sparta, Ontario and became a farmer and apple grower by career.

Mills attended schools in Elgin. He served for eight years as a municipal councillor in Sparta, Ontario and for four years as a regional councillor for Elgin County, Ontario, becoming that county's warden in 1920.

He was first elected to Parliament at the Elgin West riding in a by-election on 24 September 1934, replacing Mitchell Hepburn who resigned to run in the 1934 provincial election becoming Premier of Ontario. Mills was re-elected at Elgin in the 1935 federal election and again in 1940. After completing his term in the 19th Canadian Parliament, Mills left federal politics and did not seek another term in the 1945 election.

References

External links
 

1882 births
1955 deaths
Canadian farmers
Liberal Party of Canada MPs
Members of the House of Commons of Canada from Ontario
People from Elgin County